Alexander Givental is a Russian-American mathematician working in symplectic topology and singularity theory, as well as their relation to topological string theories. He graduated from Moscow Phys-Math school number 2 (later renamed into Lyceum ) and then the Gubkin Russian State University of Oil and Gas, and he finally his Ph.D. under the supervision of V. I. Arnold in 1987. He emigrated to the United States in 1990. He provided the first proof of the mirror conjecture for Calabi–Yau manifolds that are complete intersections in toric ambient spaces, in particular for quintic hypersurfaces in  P4.  He is now Professor of Mathematics at the University of California, Berkeley. As an extracurricular activity, he translates Russian poetry into English and publishes books, including his own translation of a textbook in geometry by Andrey Kiselyov and poetry of Marina Tsvetaeva. Givental is a father of two.

References

.
 Sumizdat, publisher of English translation of Geometry
  MAA review of Geometry

External links
Personal website at Berkeley

20th-century American mathematicians
21st-century American mathematicians
Russian mathematicians
Algebraic geometers
American people of Russian descent
Living people
University of California, Berkeley College of Letters and Science faculty
Soviet mathematicians
1958 births